Erik William Gustav Leidzén (1894–1962) was a Swedish musician, known for his compositions and arrangements for concert band and British-style Brass Bands.

He was born into a Salvation Army family in Stockholm, Sweden on Easter Sunday, March 25, 1894. He took up the E-flat flugelhorn at age 6, and attended the Royal Swedish Academy of Music, graduating with honors in 1914. He emigrated to the United States in 1915, and continued his association with Salvation Army music there.

He was also known for his association with Edwin Franko Goldman, many of whose works Leidzén transcribed or arranged.

He died in New York City on December 20, 1962 shortly after suffering a stroke.

References

Further reading
 
 Holz, Ronald W. (1990) Erik Leidzen Band Arranger and Composer  Studies in The History and Interpretation of Music Volume 29 The Edwin Mellen Press.0889464723
 Fossey, Leslie (1966) This Man Leidzen 0854121498Erik W.G. Leidzen The Poetry of Erik Leidzen (Compiler Donald Ross) Salvation Army Archives, Leidzen's Papers, 221/31

American male composers
1894 births
1962 deaths
20th-century American composers
20th-century American male musicians
Swedish emigrants to the United States